Born Again is a remix collection of Wumpscut songs from previous albums.

Track listing

See also
List of Works by Rudy Ratzinger

References

External links
Official Page
Online information search

Wumpscut albums
1997 remix albums